Intel Xe (stylized as Xe and pronounced as two separate letters, abbreviation for "eXascale for everyone"), earlier known unofficially as Gen12, is a GPU architecture developed by Intel.

Intel Xe includes a new instruction set architecture. The Xe GPU family consists of a series of microarchitectures, ranging from integrated/low power (Xe-LP), to enthusiast/high performance gaming (Xe-HPG), datacenter/high performance (Xe-HP) and high performance computing (Xe-HPC).

History 
Intel's first attempt at a dedicated graphics card was the Intel740, released in February 1998. The Intel740 was considered unsuccessful due to its performance which was lower than market expectations, causing Intel to cease development on future discrete graphics products. However, its technology lived on in the Intel Extreme Graphics lineup. Intel made another attempt with the Larrabee architecture before canceling it in 2009; this time, the technology developed was used in the Xeon Phi, which was discontinued in 2020.

In April 2018, it was reported that Intel was assembling a team to develop discrete graphics processing units, targeting both datacenters, as well as the PC gaming market, and therefore competitive with products from both Nvidia and AMD. Rumors supporting the claim included that the company had vacancies for over 100 graphics-related jobs, and had taken on former Radeon Technologies Group (AMD) leader Raja Koduri in late 2017 – the new product was reported to be codenamed "Arctic Sound". The project was reported to have initially been targeting video streaming chips for data centers, but had its scope expanded to include desktop GPUs.

In June 2018, Intel confirmed it planned to launch a discrete GPU in 2020.

The first functional discrete "Xe" GPU, codenamed "DG1", was reported as having begun testing in October 2019.

According to a report by Hexus in late 2019, a discrete GPU would launch in mid 2020; combined GPU/CPU (GPGPU) products were also expected, for data center and autonomous driving applications. The product is expected to be initially built on a 10 nm node (with 7 nm products in 2021) and use Intel's Foveros die stacking packaging technology (see 3D die stacking).

Architecture 
Intel Xe expands upon the microarchitectural overhaul introduced in Gen 11 with a full refactor of the instruction set architecture. While Xe is a family of architectures, each variant has significant differences from each other as these are made with their targets in mind. The Xe GPU family consists of Xe-LP, Xe-HP, Xe-HPC, and Xe-HPG sub-architectures.

Unlike previous Intel graphics processing units which used the Execution Unit (EU) as a compute unit, Xe-HPG and Xe-HPC use the Xe-core. This is similar to an Xe-LP subslice. An Xe-core contains vector and matrix arithmetic logic units, which are referred to as vector and matrix engines. Other components include L1 cache and other hardware.

Xe-LP (Low Power)
Xe-LP is the low power variant of the Xe architecture. Xe-LP is present as integrated graphics for 11th-generation Intel Core and the Iris Xe MAX mobile dedicated GPU (codenamed DG1), as well as in the H3C XG310 Intel Server GPU (codenamed SG1). Compared to its predecessor, Xe-LP includes new features such as Sampler Feedback, Dual Queue Support, DirectX12 View Instancing Tier2, and AV1 8-bit and 10-bit fixed-function hardware decoding.

Xe-HP (High Performance)
Xe-HP is the datacenter/high performance variant of Xe, optimized for FP64 performance and multi-tile scalability.

Xe-HPC (High Performance Compute)
Xe-HPC is the high performance computing variant of the Xe architecture. An Xe-HPC Xe-core contains 8 vector and 8 matrix engines, alongside a large 512 KB L1 cache. It powers Ponte Vecchio.

Xe-HPG (High Performance Graphics) 
Xe-HPG is the enthusiast or high performance graphics variant of the Xe architecture. The microarchitecture is based on Xe-LP with improvements from Xe-HP and Xe-HPC. The microarchitecture is focused on graphics performance and supports hardware-accelerated ray tracing, DisplayPort 2.0, XeSS or supersampling based on neural networks (similar to Nvidia DLSS), and DirectX 12 Ultimate.
 Intel confirmed ASTC support has been removed from hardware starting with Alchemist and future Intel Arc GPU microarchitectures will also not support it. An Xe-HPG Xe-core contains 16 vector engines and 16 matrix engines. An Xe-HPG render slice will consist of four Xe-cores, ray tracing hardware, and other components.

Intel Xe 2 

A successor to Xe was revealed during Intel Architecture Day 2021, under the name of Xe 2, codenamed Battlemage. It is currently under development. In an exclusive Interview with HardwareLuxx Tom Peterson confirmed that Xe2 will be segmented into "Xe2-LPG" (Low Power Graphics) for integrated GPUs and "Xe2-HPG" (High Performane Graphics) for discrete GPUs.

Intel Xe 3 

Intel Xe 3 is the upcoming successor to the Intel Xe 2 microarchitecture codenamed Celestial and is scheduled for a 2024 release as per Intel's GPU roadmap.

Intel Xe 4 

Intel Xe 4 is the upcoming successor to the Intel Xe 3 microarchitecture codenamed Druid.

Products using Xe

Integrated graphics 

Newer Intel processors use the Xe-LP microarchitecture. These include 11th generation Intel Core processors (codenamed "Tiger Lake" and "Rocket Lake"), 12th generation Intel Core processors (codenamed "Alder Lake"), and 13th generation Intel Core processors (codenamed "Raptor Lake").

Discrete graphics

Intel Iris Xe Max (DG1)

In August 2020, Intel was reported to be shipping Xe DG1 GPUs for a possible late 2020 release, while also commenting on a DG2 GPU aimed at the enthusiast market (later found out to be the first generation of Intel Arc nicknamed "Alchemist"). The DG1 is also sold as the Iris Xe MAX and as Iris Xe Graphics (stylized as iRIS Xe) in laptops, while cards for developers are sold as the DG1 SDV.

The Xe MAX is an entry-level GPU that was first released on November 1, 2020, in China and is similar in most aspects to the integrated GPU found in Tiger Lake processors, the only differences being a higher clock speed, slightly higher performance and dedicated memory and a dedicated TDP requirement. It competes with Nvidia's laptop-level GeForce MX series GPUs. It is aimed at slim and highly portable productivity laptops and has 4GB of dedicated LPDDR4X-4266 memory with a 128-bit wide memory bus, has 96 EUs, 48 texture units, 24 ROPs, a peak clock speed of 1650 MHz and a performance of 2.46 FP32 teraFLOPs with a 25w TDP. By comparison, the integrated GPU in Tiger Lake processors has a performance 
of 2.1 FP32 teraFLOPs. The Xe MAX does not replace the system's integrated GPU; instead it was designed to work alongside it, so tasks are split between the integrated and discrete GPUs. It was initially available on only 3 laptops: The Asus VivoBook Flip 14 TP470, the Acer Swift 3X, and the Dell Inspiron 15 7000. Intel Xe MAX GPUs can only be found on systems with Tiger Lake processors.

Intel officially announced Intel Iris Xe Graphics desktop cards for OEMs and system integrators on January 26, 2021. It is aimed at mainstream desktop and business PCs as an improvement over other graphics options in AV1 video decoding, HDR (high dynamic range) video support and deep learning inference, and is not as powerful as its laptop counterpart, with only 80 enabled EUs. The first cards are made by Asus, have DisplayPort 1.4, HDMI 2.0, Dual Link DL-DVI-D outputs and are passively cooled.

Intel Arc 
Intel Arc is a high-performance discrete graphics line optimized for gaming. This will compete directly with the Radeon and GeForce lines of graphics processing units. The first generation (codenamed "Alchemist"), was developed under the "DG2" name and is based on the Xe-HPG architecture. Future generations are codenamed Battlemage ("DG3", based on Xe2), Celestial ("DG4", based on Xe3), and Druid ("DG5").

Desktop

Mobile

Workstation

Datacenter

Ponte Vecchio 
Intel officially announced their Xe general HPC/AI GPU codenamed Ponte Vecchio on November 17, 2019. It was revealed to use the Xe-HPC variant of the architecture and Intel's 'Embedded Multi-Die Interconnect Bridge' (EMIB) and Foveros die stacking packaging on a Intel 4 node (previously referred to as 7 nm). Intel later confirmed at Architecture Day 2021 that Ponte Vecchio would use Compute Tiles manufactured on TSMC N5, Base Tiles and Rambo Cache Tiles manufactured using Intel 7 (previously referred to as  10 nm Enhanced SuperFin) and Xe Link Tiles manufactured on the TSMC N7 process. The new GPU is expected to be used in Argonne National Laboratory's new exascale supercomputer, Aurora, with compute nodes comprising two next generation Intel Xeon (codenamed "Sapphire Rapids") CPUs, and six Ponte Vecchio GPUs.

See also 
 Larrabee (microarchitecture)
 Intel Graphics Technology
 Arc Alchemist series

References 

GPGPU
Graphics microarchitectures
Intel microarchitectures
Intel graphics